Kanakaster is a genus of echinoderms belonging to the family Goniasteridae.

The species of this genus are found in Australia and East Africa.

Species:

Kanakaster balutensis 
Kanakaster convexus 
Kanakaster discus 
Kanakaster larae 
Kanakaster plinthinos 
Kanakaster solidus

References

Goniasteridae
Asteroidea genera